This is a list of episodes from the anime series Hamtaro, based on the children's book series by Ritsuko Kawai. The anime series is directed by Osamu Nabeshima and produced by Shogakukan. The series involves the adventure of a brave and childlike hamster named Hamtaro, with his Ham-Ham friends. It began airing in Japan on July 7, 2000. Hamtaro has been aired throughout the world on many stations.

As of April 5, 2006, a series known as Norisuta Hai began airing five-minute Hamtaro episodes known as "Tottoko Hamutaro: Norisuta Hai!" The Norisuta Hai series is animated differently from the original series; most notably the head-to-body ratio is off, and is designed to appeal to a younger audience. There does not seem to be any connection between Hamtaro and Tottoko Hamutaro: Norisuta Hai! beyond the planned appearance of all fifteen original Ham-Hams (excluding Lapis and Lazuli).

Hamtaro 1.1 – 1.12 were released in Australia, with three episodes on each DVD. But there are no plans for further releases for the other episodes. Hamtaro Volume 1 – Volume 3, with four episodes on each DVD were released in Germany by RTL2. In the U.S. episodes on each DVD from Viz, with previews of Hamtaro stuff, including a CBS promo for the show, a trailer of the Hamtaro: Ham-Hams Unite! video game, a commercial of the Hamtaro Playhouse set, and a promo for Franklin. In Singapore, Hamtaro DVD box sets are available with 4 discs of the first season (26 episodes) with six episodes on each disc. There are also boxed sets of 27 episodes with six to seven episodes on each of four discs. Hamtaro Seasons 2, 3, and 4 are released that way.

Episodes list

Season 1

Season 2

Season 3

Season 4

Season 5

Season 6

Season 7

Season 8

Season 9

Season 10

Season 11

Season 12

OVAs

Films

Box office

References 

Hamtaro
Hamtaro